Edwin Ouon (born 26 January 1981) is a Rwandan former professional footballer who played as a defender. He was regarded as one of the best centre backs in the Cypriot First Division league, having won the 'Defender of the year' prize in the 2008–09 season.

Club career
Ouon was born in Aubervilliers, France.

In 2008, he signed for AEL Limassol. In the 2011–12 season he was one of the key players helping the team win the Cypriot First Division. The 2012–13 season started very well for Ouon and he participated in UEFA Europa League.

Honours
AEL Limassol
 Cypriot First Division: 2011–12

References

External links
 
 
 
 Steaua interest in Ouon 
 Profile at aelfc.com 

1981 births
Living people
French people of Rwandan descent
Sportspeople from Aubervilliers
Association football central defenders
Association football fullbacks
Rwandan footballers
French footballers
Rwanda international footballers
Rwandan expatriate footballers
Cypriot First Division players
Belgian Pro League players
Challenger Pro League players
Super League Greece players
Tercera División players
Red Star F.C. players
Cagliari Calcio players
Royal Antwerp F.C. players
K.V. Oostende players
Beerschot A.C. players
Aris Limassol FC players
AEL Limassol players
Levadiakos F.C. players
Expatriate footballers in Cyprus
Expatriate footballers in Belgium
Expatriate footballers in Italy
Expatriate footballers in Spain
Expatriate footballers in Greece
Footballers from Seine-Saint-Denis